Robert McGhee (born 24 March 1963) is an Australian cricketer. He played in four first-class matches for Queensland in 1990/91.

See also
 List of Queensland first-class cricketers

References

External links
 

1963 births
Living people
Australian cricketers
Queensland cricketers
Cricketers from Queensland